This list contains notable people associated with Lake Brantley High School in Altamonte Springs, Florida, including alumni and current and former faculty.

Alumni

Dee Brown (graduated 1996) - professional football player
Wendy Bruce - 1992 Olympic bronze medalist (team) for gymnastics
Chris DiMarco (graduated 1986) - professional golfer, 2005 Masters runner-up
Patrick DiMarco (graduated 2007) - professional football player, nephew of professional golfer Chris DiMarco
Nick Franklin (graduated 2009) - professional baseball player, currently plays for Los Angeles Angels
John Gast - baseball player
Tion Green - Professional football player
Matt Heafy - lead singer and rhythm guitarist of metal band Trivium
Michael Johnson - musician
Hunter Kemper - (graduated 1994) - Olympic triathlete
Adam Kluger (student for one year, then transferred) - CEO of The Kluger Agency, Forbes Magazine's most powerful people in music under 30 years old in 2012
Kam Lee - drummer, Mantas, Death, Massacre (vocalist)
Felipe López (graduated 1998) - professional baseball player
Kara Monaco (graduated 2001) - Playboy's Playmate of the Year 2006, contestant on Big Brother 14 on CBS (2012)
Mandy Moore (student for one year, then transferred) - pop singer, actress
Rick Rozz - musician
Drew Seeley (graduated 2000) - actor/musician
Josh Segarra - actor/musician
Kim Shaw - actress
Steven Sinofsky (graduated 1983) - executive at Microsoft
Travis Smith - former drummer of metal band Trivium
Rob Thomas - lead singer of Matchbox Twenty
Jason Varitek (graduated 1990) - retired professional baseball player, 3-time All-Star, 2-time World Series champion
Jonny Venters - professional baseball player
Jemile Weeks (graduated 2005) - professional baseball player
Rickie Weeks (graduated 2000) - professional baseball player, currently with Tampa Bay Rays
Charlie "Cosmo" Wilson (Attended 1976-77 and 1978–79) - concert lighting designer
Graham Zusi (graduated 2005) - professional soccer player, currently plays for Sporting Kansas City
Parc Jae Jung - South Korean singer, songwriter
 Ronnie Brewer (graduated 1989) (ballroom dancer/lead singer of The Wiggles)

Faculty

References

Lists of people by educational affiliation in Florida

Lists of American people by school affiliation